The 2021–22 SPHL season was the 18th season of the Southern Professional Hockey League (SPHL). The playoffs concluded on May 3, 2022 with the Peoria Rivermen defeating the Roanoke Rail Yard Dawgs in 4 games in the President's Cup Finals, claiming their first President's Cup.

League business
After playing a shortened 2020–21 season with only five teams, the league returned with all ten clubs from the 2019–20 season and added an expansion team, the Vermilion County Bobcats.

Regular season

Standings
As of April 10, 2022.

 indicates team has clinched William B. Coffey Trophy (regular season champion) and a playoff spot
 indicates team has clinched a playoff spot
 indicates team has been eliminated from playoff contention

Statistical leaders

Leading skaters 
The following players are sorted by points, then goals. Updated as of April 10, 2022.

GP = Games played; G = Goals; A = Assists; Pts = Points; PIM = Penalty minutes

Leading goaltenders 
The following goaltenders with a minimum 660 minutes played lead the league in goals against average. Updated as of April 10, 2022.

GP = Games played; TOI = Time on ice (in minutes); SA = Shots against; GA = Goals against; SO = Shutouts; GAA = Goals against average; SV% = Save percentage; W = Wins; L = Losses; OT = Overtime/shootout loss

Postseason
For 2022, the format returned to the top eight teams at the end of the regular season qualifying for the playoffs.

Playoff bracket

Quarterfinals

(1) Knoxville Ice Bears vs. (8) Roanoke Rail Yard Dawgs

(2) Huntsville Havoc vs. (7) Evansville Thunderbolts

(3) Peoria Rivermen vs. (6) Pensacola Ice Flyers

(4) Fayetteville Marksmen vs. (5) Quad City Storm

Semifinals

(2) Huntsville Havoc vs. (8) Roanoke Rail Yard Dawgs

(3) Peoria Rivermen vs. (5) Quad City Storm

President's Cup Final

(3) Peoria Rivermen vs. (8) Roanoke Rail Yard Dawgs

Statistical leaders

Skaters 
The following players are sorted by points, then goals. Updated as of May 3, 2022.

GP = Games played; G = Goals; A = Assists; Pts = Points; PIM = Penalty minutes

Goaltenders 
The following goaltenders with a minimum 350 minutes played lead the playoffs in goals against average. Updated as of May 3, 2022.

GP = Games played; TOI = Time on ice (in minutes); SA = Shots against; GA = Goals against; SO = Shutouts; GAA = Goals against average; SV% = Save percentage; W = Wins; L = Losses; OT = Overtime/shootout loss

Awards

All-SPHL selections

Milestones and records 
 On January 22, 2022 – The Pensacola Ice Flyers defeat the Macon Mayhem 13–4 (record for most goals by one team)

References

External links
Southern Professional Hockey League website

Southern Professional Hockey League seasons
SPHL